Muhammad Anis Ahmed (born 10 December 1973, in Gojra) is a field hockey player and former member of the Pakistan National Hockey Team. He played for Pakistan's national team in the 2000 Summer Olympics and the 1998 Asian Games, where the team won bronze medals. He played 87 matches for Pakistan and scored 24 goals in his career.

References

Field hockey players at the 2000 Summer Olympics
Pakistani Asian Games Teams
phf.com.pk

External links

Pakistani male field hockey players
1973 births
Living people
Olympic field hockey players of Pakistan
Field hockey players at the 2000 Summer Olympics
Field hockey players at the 1998 Asian Games
Asian Games bronze medalists for Pakistan

Medalists at the 1998 Asian Games
Asian Games medalists in field hockey
Field hockey players from Punjab, Pakistan
20th-century Pakistani people